UKP may refer to:

 Ukrainian Communist Party
 Pound sterling (non-standard code)
 Unbounded knapsack problem, a problem in combinatorial optimization
 Ubiquitous Knowledge Processing Lab (UKP Lab), at the Technische Universität Darmstadt